Mehdi Marandi (born 12 May 1986 in Ghazvin) also known as Siamak Marandi or Mahdi Marandi, is an Iranian volleyball player who plays as a libero for the Iran national team. He competed at the Rio 2016 Summer Olympics.

Honours

National team
World Grand Champions Cup
Bronze medal (1): 2017
Asian Games
Gold medal (1): 2018

References

External links 

 

1986 births
Living people
Iranian men's volleyball players
Olympic volleyball players of Iran
Volleyball players at the 2016 Summer Olympics
Asian Games medalists in volleyball
Volleyball players at the 2018 Asian Games
Medalists at the 2018 Asian Games
Asian Games gold medalists for Iran
Volleyball players at the 2020 Summer Olympics
Liberos
People from Qazvin
21st-century Iranian people